The white pine barkminer moth (Marmara fasciella) is a moth of the family Gracillariidae. It is found in Québec, Canada, and Kentucky, Maryland, New York, Vermont and Maine in the United States.

Adults are on wing from May to early July. The larvae feed on Quercus species, Abies balsamea, Pinus monticula and Pinus strobus. They mine the bark of their host plant. The larvae make long, linear mines in the bark of the trunk and branches. The cocoon is spun under loose bark at the end of the mine.

References

External links
Marmara at microleps.org
Bug Guide

Gracillariinae
Moths described in 1875